The Crown Bridges is the name given to three bridges under construction in the Finnish city of Helsinki, creating a new tram link and cycle path to the island of Laajasalo.

Background
The city council of Helsinki decided on 31 August 2016 to build a tramway to the island of Laajasalo, located to the east of Helsinki city centre. The bridges will have bicycle and pedestrian lanes in addition to the tramway, but no lanes for private cars.

There are several new areas of housing under construction on the island as of 2016. The site of a former oil shipping terminal at Kruunuvuorenranta is expected to house 12,500 new residents when construction is completed by 2025, and densification of other areas on Laajasalo is expected to add another 10,000. The tramway connection over a series of bridges was originally chosen as the basis for development by Helsinki city council on 12 November 2008. The discarded alternatives were an extension of the Helsinki Metro in a tunnel or over a bridge. The completed tramway plan and its funding were finally approved by the council only in August 2016, almost eight years later.

The island will be linked to the Helsinki city centre by a tram connection built on bridges from Merihaka via Sompasaari and Korkeasaari across the Kruunuvuorenselkä bay and into Kruunuvuorenranta. Instead of three lines in earlier versions, the approved plan includes only two lines:

 Central Railway Station – Hakaniemi – Kruunuvuorenranta – Yliskylä (45-meter bidirectional tram units), and
 Kolmikulma – Central Railway Station – Hakaniemi – Kruunuvuorenranta – Haakoninlahti (existing-type rolling stock, 30-meter unidirectional units)

However, in 2021 the approved plan was split into two different stages: the tram connection will not reach the Central Station at first but Hakaniemi market square instead. The temporary terminus serves as a hub for many public transport connections, including trams, buses and Hakaniemi metro station. The stated aim is to have the tramway operational between Yliskylä and Hakaniemi in 2027. Construction of the second phase of the project will start in 2026 and is estimated to be completed in 2028. 

In the plan dated in May 2016, the bridge and tramway structures are projected to cost 259 million euros, although in 2021 the maximum price was increased to 326 million euros. Additionally, the required investments in a depot and rolling stock are projected at 20–25 and 75–80 million euros, respectively. In 2021 the Helsinki City Transport (HKL) ordered 23 ForCity Smart Artic X54 trams to operate on the Crown Bridges. The very same model, also known as Artic XL, is to operate on Jokeri light rail as well.

Construction 

Construction of the bridges started in October 2021. The first tracks were laid on Laajasalo island on 31 May 2022.

Technical data

Further plans 
In 2008, the city council approved a motion that in the further planning of the Laajasalo area tram, expanding the tram network to the Herttoniemi metro station should be investigated. Additionally, in case that the military base in Santahamina will be freed for residential construction in the future, provisions will be made for converting the tram lines into a light rail system that would extend into Santahamina in the south and travel in a tunnel from Korkeasaari to Katajanokka, linking with the planned north–south line of the Helsinki Metro.

References

Transport in Helsinki
Tram transport in Finland
2026 in rail transport